Xihu Subdistrict is a subdistrict of Yuelu District in Changsha, Hunan, China. It was formed in 1998. The subdistrict has eight communities and two villages under its jurisdiction.

History
The subdistrict of Xihu was reorganized from the former Xihu Fishery Farm in 1998. The state-owned fishery farm of Xihu was established from Xianjiahu Brigade, Wangluqiao Brigade, part of Lushan Brigade in Yuelushan Commune, and part of Wangyue Brigade in Wangyue Commune in December 1973.

References

External links
 Official Website （Chinese / 中文）

Yuelu District
Subdistricts of Changsha